109th meridian may refer to:

109th meridian east, a line of longitude east of the Greenwich Meridian
109th meridian west, a line of longitude west of the Greenwich Meridian